Cyperus rapensis is a species of sedge that is native to the Tubuai Islands.

See also 
 List of Cyperus species

References 

rapensis
Plants described in 1931
Flora of the Tubuai Islands
Taxa named by Forest B.H. Brown